Laurie Rousseau-Nepton is a Canadian astronomer at the Canada–France–Hawaii Telescope, a postdoctoral researcher at the University of Hawaii, and is the first indigenous woman in Canada to obtain a Ph.D. in astrophysics.

Early life, education and research 

Rousseau-Nepton is an Innu woman whose family are from the Mashteuiatsh reserve in the Saguenay–Lac-Saint-Jean region of Quebec. She grew up near Quebec City, and lived for two years on the Wendake reserve. Rousseau-Nepton received her Ph.D. in 2017 from Université Laval, under the supervision of Carmelle Robert. Her doctoral research involved studying the HII regions of nearby spiral galaxies, using the SpIOMM, a imaging Fourier transform spectrometer developed at University of Laval. She subsequently took up an appointment as an  postdoctoral research fellow at the University of Hawaiʻi at Hilo. Since 2017, she has been a resident astronomer at the Canada–France–Hawaii Telescope. Rousseau-Nepton is the Principal Investigator for SIGNALS, a large survey program aiming at observing over 50,000 resolved star-forming regions in nearby galaxies.

Honors and awards
Awards won include:

 Post-Doctoral Fellow, Fonds de Recherche du Québec – Nature et Technologies (FRQNT), 2017-2019
 Pierre Amiot - Award for the best scientific talk, Université Laval, 2014
 Hubert Reeves Fellowship, Fonds Hubert Reeves, 2010
 Fellowship for native woman in science, Association des femmes diplômées des universités du Québec (AFDU) 2010

References 

Living people
21st-century Canadian astronomers
21st-century First Nations people
21st-century Canadian women scientists
Year of birth missing (living people)
Scientists from Quebec
Canadian astrophysicists
Women astrophysicists
Innu people
Université Laval alumni